The kajukki is a decked river boat used by Finnic peoples of north Eurasia.

Boat types